Lucerne Capital Management  is a long-short equity investment firm, founded in 2000 by Pieter Taselaar, that specializes in bottom up stock selection with a focus on European markets.

Overview
Pieter Taselaar founded Lucerne Capital Management after leaving investment bank ABN in 2002. Lucerne is  headquartered in Greenwich, Connecticut and the company has a research office in Amsterdam, Netherlands. The firm has 12 employees (excluding clerical workers) and in March 2019 reported $1,107,764,000 in assets under management. Lucerne Capital invests in companies with strong free cash flow.

Lucerne Capital ranked 25th in Barron's 2016 list of "Best 100 Hedge Funds".

Investments
In the 4th quarter of 2017, Lucerne Capital purchased a new stake in Altice USA, valued at about $129,721,000, bringing its total shares to 7,455,917.

References

External links

Investment companies of the United States
Financial services companies established in 2002
Companies based in the Royal Borough of Greenwich